

Portugal
 Angola – José Maria da Ponte e Horta, Governor-General of Angola (1870–1873)

British Empire
 Jamaica – Sir John Peter Grant, Governor of Jamaica (1866–1874)
Malta Colony – Patrick Grant, Governor of Malta (1867–1872)
New South Wales – Somerset Lowry-Corry, Lord Belmore, Governor of New South Wales (1868–1872)
 Queensland 
 Samuel Blackall, Governor of Queensland (1868–1871)
 George Phipps, Lord Normanby, Governor of Queensland (1871–1874)
 Tasmania – Sir Charles Du Cane, Governor of Tasmania (1869–1874)
 South Australia – Sir James Fergusson, Bt, Governor of South Australia (1869–1873)
 Victoria – John Manners-Sutton, Lord Canterbury, Governor of Victoria (1866–1873)
 Western Australia – Major Frederick Weld, Governor of Western Australia (1869–1875)

Colonial governors
Colonial governors
1871